PRTM is a management consulting subsidiary of PwC. The firm's business centers on the areas of operational strategy, supply chain innovation, product innovation, and customer experience innovation.

PRTM works in these industry sectors: automotive, aerospace and defense, chemicals and process industries, telecommunications, consumer goods and retail, electronics, energy, financial services, healthcare, private equity, public sector, semiconductor, and software.

History

The firm was founded in 1976 in Palo Alto, California. When the firm added eastern United States operations in 1977, it was incorporated as Pittiglio, Rabin, Todd & McGrath after its founding partners Theodore Pittiglio, Robert Rabin, Robert Todd, and Michael McGrath. Today, the firm is known as PRTM. On June 24, 2011, PricewaterhouseCoopers (PwC) acquired PRTM and the deal closed on August 22, 2011.

The firm began benchmarking business performance for its clients in 1982. PRTM's international expansion started in 1985. In 1988, PRTM created the "Product and Cycle-time Excellence" (PACE) framework to provide companies with a multidisciplinary approach to innovation. PRTM co-developed the "Supply-Chain Operations Reference-model" (SCOR) with the Supply-Chain Council in 1996. In 1997, the firm launched a subsidiary, The Performance Measurement Group, LLC (PMG).

Bibliography 

Making Innovation Work: How to Manage It, Measure It, and Profit From It (by Tony Davila, Marc J. Epstein, and Robert Shelton, Wharton School Publishing, 2005),
Strategic Supply Chain Management: The Five Disciplines for Top Performance (by Shoshanah Cohen and Joseph Roussel, McGraw-Hill, 2004),
Strategic IT Portfolio Management (by Jeffrey Kaplan, PRTM, 2005),
Next Generation Product Development: How to Increase Productivity, Cut Costs, and Reduce Cycle Times (McGraw-Hill, 2004),
Setting the PACE in Product Development: A Guide to Product And Cycle-time Excellence (by Michael E. McGrath, Butterworth-Heinemann, rev. ed. 1996),
Voices into Choices: Acting on the Voice of the Customer (by Gary Burchill and Christina Hepner Brodie, Joiner Associates, 1997),
Product Strategy for High-Technology Companies: How to Achieve Growth, Competitive Advantage, and Increased Profits, (by Michael McGrath, McGraw-Hill, 2nd ed., 2000).

References

Consulting firms established in 1976
International management consulting firms
Privately held companies based in Massachusetts
Companies based in Waltham, Massachusetts
Macroeconomics consulting firms
Management consulting firms of the United States
PricewaterhouseCoopers
1976 establishments in California